Yves Klein Blue Draw Attention to Themselves is an EP by Yves Klein Blue released on 1 April 2008 on Dew Process. An EP of the same name had been produced by the band themselves for sale at local shows, but was re-recorded and produced by Caleb James, a renowned Australian producer. This subsequent re-release saw the band get picked up by Dew Process. The band's first single, Polka, received regular airplay on alternative radio station Triple J, and was followed by the release of their second single, Silence is Distance. Videos were shot for both of these singles, as well as for The Streetlight, which was curiously left off the label re-release of the EP.

"Polka" also performed well in 2008 Triple J Hottest 100 voting, coming in at 76 in the overall list.

Track listing

Self-released EP

 "The Streetlight"
 "Blasphemy"
 "Fall Asleep"
 "Silence is Distance"
 "Polka"

Dew Process re-release

 "Blasphemy"
 "Not What I Want"
 "19"
 "Silence is Distance"
 "Polka"
 "(A Bookend)"

Personnel

Michael Tomlinson – lead vocals, rhythm guitar
Charles Sale – lead guitar, keyboards, backing vocals
Sean Cook – bass, backing vocals
Chris Banham – drums, percussion

References

2008 EPs
EPs by Australian artists
Indie rock EPs
2008 debut albums
Yves Klein Blue albums